Miami Lakes is an incorporated town in Miami-Dade County, Florida, United States. As of the 2020 census, the population was 30,467.

History
The development was constructed by Sengra (now the Graham Companies) beginning in 1962 on land formerly owned by Florida state senator Ernest "Cap" Graham. The Grahams stated for many years that it would be a 30-year development, but they are still developing to this day.

The original Miami Lakes development, east of the Palmetto Expressway, was master-planned by Lester Collins with curving tree-shaded roadways and numerous curving lakes, which are unusual compared to most surrounding areas with their treeless streets on a square grid and rectangular lakes. This original development, which is on the east side of the more recently designated Town of Miami Lakes, has neighborhood shopping centers, tot-lot parks, and a town center named Main Street. A significant portion of Miami Lakes is still owned by the Grahams, mostly apartment buildings, shopping centers, office buildings, and undeveloped land. The town is an early model of the New Urbanism movement, with shopping and services located within walking distance of residences as well as narrow, walkable streets and plenty of neighborhood parks.

When it was incorporated in December 2000, the Town of Miami Lakes became the 31st municipality in Miami-Dade County. Miami Lakes is home to approximately 30,000 residents and more than 1,100 businesses.

The Master Plan began over 50 years ago when the Graham family began the development of what was their dairy farm. Unlike many cities and towns created during the early 1960s, the Grahams decided to create a master plan for the city that would allow decades of growth, construction, and changing market conditions. Lester Collins, former dean of the Harvard School of Design, was enlisted to create a master plan for the area that would become the center of Miami Lakes. Collins laid the foundation for an integrated community, including residential, commercial, industrial, and mixed uses.

Former U.S. Senator Bob Graham, the younger half-brother of family patriarch William "Bill" Graham, is one of the owners, and Katharine Graham, the late publisher of the Washington Post, had a share by marriage. On December 5, 2000, Miami Lakes voted to become an incorporated town.

Geography
It is bordered to the south and west by the city of Hialeah, to the east by the city of Miami Gardens, and to the north by the unincorporated community of Country Club.

Demographics

2020 census

As of the 2020 United States census, there were 30,467 people, 10,570 households, and 7,491 families residing in the town.

2010 census

, there were 8,248 households, out of which 4.2% were vacant. In 2000, 37.7% had children under the age of 18 living with them, 58.6% were married couples living together, 12.0% had a female householder with no husband present, and 25.9% were non-families. 20.8% of all households were made up of individuals, and 4.8% had someone living alone who was 65 years of age or older. The average household size was 2.75 and the average family size was 3.21.

2000 census
In 2000, the population was spread out, with 25.1% under the age of 18, 7.2% from 18 to 24, 34.9% from 25 to 44, 22.7% from 45 to 64, and 10.1% who were 65 years of age or older. The median age was 36 years. For every 100 females, there were 92.6 males. For every 100 females age 18 and over, there were 89.4 males.

-2013, the median income for a household in the town was $63,754 and the median income for a family was $68,431. Males had a median income of $45,759 versus $31,656 for females. The per capita income for the town was $28,867. About 3.8% of families and 4.9% of the population were below the poverty line, including 4.1% of those under age 18 and 5.2% of those age 65 or over.

As of 2000, speakers of Spanish as a first language accounted for 72.41%, while English made up 24.65%, Portuguese was at 0.67%, and Urdu consisted of 0.64% of residents.

Government
Since its incorporation in 2000, the Town of Miami Lakes operates under a council-manager form of government. The council-manager system combines the strong leadership of elected officials with the strong managerial experience of an appointed town manager.

The mayor's seat is elected at-large for a four-year term. As defined in the town's charter, the mayor shall preside at meetings of the council and be a voting member of the council. The town council is vested with all legislative powers of the town. The council consists of the mayor and six members.

Current council members are:
 Mayor – Manny Cid
 Councilmember Seat 1 – Tony Fernandez
 Councilmember Seat 2 – Ray Garcia
 Councilmember Seat 3 – Marilyn Ruano
 Councilmember Seat 4 – Josh Dieguez
 Councilmember Seat 5 – Luis Collazo 
 Councilmember Seat 6 – Carlos O. Alvarez * Current Vice-Mayor

The Town of Miami Lakes held a grand opening and ribbon-cutting for its new town hall on April 23, 2013, located at the east end of Main Street.

On October 5, 2010, Nelson Hernandez became the youngest council member elected to the Miami Lakes Town Council at the age of 24 since the town incorporated in 2000.

The Miami-Dade Police Department is under contract with the Town of Miami Lakes to perform law enforcement functions within the Town. 

The Miami-Dade Fire Rescue operates Station 1 Miami Lakes & Station 64 Miami Lakes West.

Economy
Several companies are headquartered in Miami Lakes, including BankUnited, N.A.; one of the largest banking institutions in the United States.

Potamkin Auto Group, The Graham Companies, Fine Art Lamps, Pacer, New Generation Computing, South Florida ENT Associates, Inktel, Isaco Interanational, Safari, 1st Financial, American Bancshares Mortgage, LLC, National Molding, Lotspeich and Oliva Cigar.

Education

Public schools
Miami-Dade County Public Schools serves Miami Lakes.

K–8 schools 
 Bob Graham Education Center
 Miami Lakes K-8 Center

Middle schools 
 Miami Lakes Middle School

High schools 
 Barbara Goleman Senior High School
 Hialeah-Miami Lakes Senior High School

Magnet schools 
 Miami Lakes Educational Center

Private schools 
 Our Lady of the Lakes Catholic School

Parks and recreation 
The town of Miami Lakes has 100+ parks, mini parks, tot lots, greenways and trails located throughout, including Miami Lakes Optimist Park, Royal Oaks Park, Town of Miami Lakes Youth Center and Veterans Park.

Cultural institutions

Veterans Memorial
Miami Lakes has a unique indoor veterans memorial located at the Royal Oaks Park Community Center. The memorial is a 50-foot-long mural that features a combination of two digitized paintings of military scenes throughout U.S. history, wood carvings, stained glass, and hand-made glass mosaics molded from leaves of Miami Lakes' trees. The centerpiece of the artwork consists of the seals from each of the US military service branches and the POW/MIA seal. The memorial was inaugurated on Memorial Day of 2011.  The artists are Alfred Darmanin and Michelle Stecco.

The veterans memorial titled "V is for Veterans" was unveiled in front of Miami Lakes Town Hall on September 4, 2014. The artwork was created by Stephanie Jaffe Werner.

Public libraries
 Miami Lakes Branch Library

Places of worship
Hope at Miami Lakes Methodist Church
Our Lady of the Lakes Catholic Church

Theaters and performance arts
Main Street Players is a local performing arts space producing live theatrical events using community talent and volunteers.

Festivals and events
Festival of Lights
Miami Lakes Cars for a Cure
Miami Lakes Farmers Market
Miami Lakes Food and Wine Festival
Miami Lakes Jingle Bell Jog
Nightmare on Montrose
Veterans Day Parade; the longest running Veterans Day Parade in all of Miami-Dade County.

Sports
Miami Lakes United Soccer Club

Media
The Miami Laker serves as the community newspaper for the town of Miami Lakes and surrounding areas in northwest Miami-Dade County.

Notable people

 Humberto Brenes, costa rican professional poker player
 Harry P. Cain, american politician 
 Adrian Cárdenas, american professional baseball second baseman
 Harry Wayne Casey, american musician, singer, songwriter, and record producer
Bob Graham, american lawyer, author and politician
 Gwen Graham, american lawyer and politician 
 Don Shula, american professional football player and coach 
 Sara Sidner, american journalist

References

External links
 

Towns in Miami-Dade County, Florida
Towns in Florida
Former census-designated places in Florida
Planned communities in Florida
1962 establishments in Florida